Brandt Township is a township in Polk County, Minnesota, United States. The population was 62 at the 2000 census. It is part of the Grand Forks-ND-MN Metropolitan Statistical Area.

Geography
The township is located near geocoordinates 48.04N, 96.565W.

Demographics
At the 2000 census, there were 62 people, 26 households and 21 families residing in the township. The racial make-up of the township was 95.16% White, 4.84% from other races. Hispanic or Latino of any race were 4.84% of the population.

There were 26 households, of which 23.1% had children under the age of 18 living with them, 73.1% were married couples living together, 7.7% had a female householder with no husband present and 19.2% were non-families. 19.2% of all households were made up of individuals, and 15.4% had someone living alone who was 65 years of age or older. The average household size was 2.38 and the average family size was 2.71.

22.6% of the population were under the age of 18, 1.6% from 18 to 24, 19.4% from 25 to 44, 33.9% from 45 to 64 and 22.6% were 65 years of age or older. The median age was 46 years. For every 100 females, there were 106.7 males. For every 100 females age 18 and over, there were 84.6 males.

The median household income was $29,583 and the median family income was $37,857. Males had a median income of $14,167 and females $17,917. The per capita income was $13,030. There were 18.2% of families and 26.6% of the population living below the poverty line, including 31.3% of under eighteens and 70.0% of those over 64.

Notes

Townships in Polk County, Minnesota
Townships in Minnesota